Hill descent control (HDC, or hill mode descent control) is a driver-assistance system allowing for a controlled hill descent in rough terrain without any brake input from the driver.

Overview
A vehicle can perform controlled descent using the anti-lock braking system (ABS) and in some cases engine braking. If a vehicle accelerates under the force of gravity, the system will automatically apply brakes to slow down to the desired vehicle speed. Cruise control buttons can adjust the speed on some vehicles. Applying pressure to the accelerator or brake pedal will override the HDC system. Land Rover originally developed HDC for use on their Freelander model which lacks low range gears usually provided on a 4x4 system (4 wheel drive).  Later implementations combine HDC with traction control and low-range gears and have reduced the set speed to slower than walking pace for extra control.

References

Advanced driver assistance systems